Maoripria is a genus of parasitoid wasps in the family Diapriidae. All four species are endemic to New Zealand, and were described in a paper by Australian entomologist Ian D. Naumann in 1988.

Species
Species within the genus Maoripria include:
 Maoripria annettae 
 Maoripria earlyi 
 Maoripria masneri 
 Maoripria verticillata

References

Diapriidae
Endemic fauna of New Zealand
Endemic insects of New Zealand
Hymenoptera of New Zealand
Insects described in 1988